Saurimo FC, formerly Bikuku FC is an Angolan sports club from the city of Saurimo.

The club was named after the original owner, Angolan businessman Ernesto dos Santos Lino, aka Santos Bikuku.

In 2018, the team qualified to the Gira Angola, the qualifying tournament for Angola's top division, the Girabola.

Prior to its participation in the Girabola, the club changed its name to Saurimo FC.

League & Cup Positions

Staff

Head coach positions
  Kito Ribeiro – 2019
  Zola Nseka – 2018

Players

External links
 Facebook profile

References

Football clubs in Angola
Sports clubs in Angola